"Guere Guerê" (alternatively written as Gueré) is the follow-up single of Brazilian sertanejo singer Alex Ferrari, based on his international success "Bara Bará Bere Berê". Its release in France coincided with the release of his debut international album Bara Bere that also includes "Bara Bará Bere Berê".

Track list
"Guere Guerê"
"Guere Guerê" (extended mix)
"Guere Guerê" (PBO Gala remix)

Charts

References

2012 songs
Portuguese-language songs